Theodore Christopher (June 5, 1958 – September 16, 2017) was an American professional racing driver and business owner who raced and won in many different types of race cars, including Modifieds, SK Modifieds, ISMA, Camping World East Series, Late Models, Pro Stocks, and Midgets.  He also raced in NASCAR's now named Monster Energy Cup Series, Xfinity Series, and Camping World Truck Series. He is best known for competing in NASCAR's Whelen Modified Tour, where he has over 40 victories and a championship in 2008. He was also well known for his success on the 1.058 mile New Hampshire Motor Speedway where Christopher has won five Camping World East Series events and 5 Whelen Modified Tour events.

Christopher was an aggressive driver, known for his infamous "Three Tap Rule" when passing cars in front of him, though his driving style changed in his later career and brought more success to his racing career.

Racing career
2001 NASCAR Weekly Series national champion, winning 15 of the 18 races that he entered, clinching it at Thompson International Speedway in Connecticut.

2008 NASCAR Whelen Modified Tour champion. Christopher, who is known as one of the most accomplished drivers in the Northeast, won both the championship and the final race of the season at Thompson International Speedway. Christopher came into the race leading the championship standings over Matt Hirschman by 31 points. Late in the race, Hirschman suffered an electrical problem, which put him a handful of laps off the pace. Christopher drove on to win the event, with Hirschman finishing 21 laps down in 25th position. It was his 31st career win in his 12th full-time year of competition.

Ironically, three years prior in 2005, Christopher went to the season finale at Thompson holding a 36-point lead over Hirschman's father, five-time tour champion Tony Hirschman, only to lose the championship due to a crash on lap 11.

NASCAR Whelen Modified Tour: . . .  48 Victories  (third all-time).  Three times voted Most Popular Driver (2008,09,10)

NASCAR K&N Pro Series East: . . .   10 victories.

Stafford (CT) Speedway . . .  131 Feature Race victories (all-time track record). 9 time SK Modified Champion.  Only active driver to ever have a Stafford grandstand named for him.

Thompson (CT) Int'l Speedway . . .  99 Feature Race victories (all-time track record). 4 time SK Modified Champion.

Waterford (CT) Speedbowl . . .  47 Feature Race victories (17th all-time).  1992 SK Modified Champion 

In addition to his racing in the Modifieds and Busch North/K&N East, he also attempted numerous Winston/Nextel Cup, Busch Series, and Craftsman Truck Series races in the 2000s. He attempted and qualified for his first Cup race at Watkins Glen in 1999. His last Cup race came in the 2006 Sylvania 300 and last attempt in the 2009 Lenox Industrial Tools 301 for Kirk Shelmerdine.

In the NASCAR Busch Series, Christopher competed part-time in 1998 with Marsh Racing, competing in three races for the team. Driving the No. 13 Whelen Engineering Chevrolet, Christopher posted the best finish of 10th at Nazareth. In 1999, the team attempted 12 races, again with Christopher driving the car. The team would make five races and posted the best finish of 8th at Nazareth.

He also competed for the then new team of Michael Waltrip Racing, competing in three races with the team at Loudon, Watkins Glen, and the inaugural race at Memphis. The last race he competed in was at Nazareth in 2001 with Richard Childress Racing in the All-Star car 21 Rockwell Automation Chevy. He finished 19th two laps down from the winner Greg Biffle.

The "Three Tap Rule"
The three NASCAR-sanctioned tracks in Connecticut use a handicap lineup system that starts the fastest cars deep in the field.  A 30 green flag lap feature gives drivers little time to be courteous if they want to win. Throughout his career, Christopher employed an aggressive driving style he referred to as the "Three Tap Rule." A combination of intimidation techniques most famously used by Dale Earnhardt in the NASCAR Cup Series as well as the "chrome horn" and "bump-and-run" techniques commonly employed in short track racing, Christopher uses a trio of taps to coerce a slower competitor into moving over or ultimately moving them himself. The initial tap informs his competitor that he is there, while the second bump is a warning to commit to a lane to let him by. If needed, the third and final tap is the classic bump and run, with Christopher moving the car in front out of his racing groove to move on by.

Death
Christopher was killed in a plane crash in North Branford near the Guilford, Connecticut, town line on September 16, 2017, while en route from Robertson Field in Plainville, Connecticut, to Francis S. Gabreski Airport in Westhampton Beach, New York, to compete in a Whelen Modified Tour race that evening at the Riverhead Raceway, in Calverton, New York, on Long Island. Christopher and Charles "Pat" Dundas, the pilot and family friend from Hauppauge, New York, who also died, were the only occupants of the Mooney M20C that went down in a wooded area. An NTSB report released in 2019 attributed the crash to fuel starvation due to pieces of towel cloth obstructing a fuel line. The aircraft impacted pine trees 1,500 feet away from an open field where investigators believed the aircraft may have been attempting an emergency landing.

Personal life
He was born to William Christopher and Lucy Graziano. He had a wife, Quinn Wazorko Christopher, and had no children with her. Christopher also had a twin brother, Mike, who also raced Modifieds, and Mike's son Mike Jr., has also begun racing Modifieds. Christopher was a 1976 graduate of Plainville High School and was a captain of the school's wrestling team. In 2013, he was inducted into the Plainville Sports Hall of Fame. He also owned and operated M&T Enterprises, which rebuilds transmissions for heavy trucks.

Honors
As part of the 25th anniversary of the NASCAR Weekly Series in 2006, Christopher was named one of the series' All Time Top 25 drivers.
In 2008 Stafford Motor Speedway named a section of their grandstand for him in honor of his 100th victory at Stafford.  Christopher, who had 109 victories at the prestigious and storied Connecticut oval, is Stafford's all-time winningest driver.
Christopher was the first driver to win SK modified track championships at all three Connecticut NASCAR Whelen All-American Series asphalt, oval short-tracks (Stafford Motor Speedway, Thompson International Speedway, and the Waterford Speedbowl) during his career.  The feat was later accomplished by Keith Rocco in 2010, the year he won his first SK Modified Championship at Waterford after multiple titles at the other two.
His twin brother Mike Christopher won before he did at Stafford. Also, the two started out racing go karts around Connecticut and the U.S. They were famous at The Pomfret Speedway in Pomfret, CT. The two also road raced with enduro karts at Daytona International Speedway, Pocono Raceway, Watkins Glen and many others.

Motorsports career results

NASCAR
(key) (Bold – Pole position awarded by qualifying time. Italics – Pole position earned by points standings or practice time. * – Most laps led. ** – All laps led.)

Sprint Cup Series

Busch Series

Craftsman Truck Series

Camping World East Series

Autozone West Series

Whelen Modified Tour

 1 Christopher was killed in a plane crash near the North Branford and Guilford, Connecticut, town line, while en route to Riverhead Raceway. He was officially credited with a "did not start" status and a 24th-place finish.

Whelen Southern Modified Tour

Rolex Sports Car Series
(key) (Races in bold indicate pole position, Results are overall/class)

24 Hours of Daytona

References

External links
 
 

1958 births
2017 deaths
Accidental deaths in Connecticut
NASCAR drivers
People from Plainville, Connecticut
Racing drivers from Connecticut
Victims of aviation accidents or incidents in the United States
Victims of aviation accidents or incidents in 2017
24 Hours of Daytona drivers
Michael Waltrip Racing drivers
Richard Childress Racing drivers